Vesel Limaj (born 1 December 1996) is a German professional footballer who plays as an attacking midfielder play for Liga I club Hermannstadt .

Early career
Born in Freising, Germany to Kosovo Albanian parents, Limaj started his youth career at SSV Ulm 1846 at the age of 6, before going on to play for 1. FC Neukölln, SV Lichtenberg 47, Berliner FC Dynamo, Tennis Borussia Berlin and Energie Cottbus at youth level. He joined Hamburger SV II in the summer of 2015 where he would remain until January 2017, which is when he signed for Austrian Football First League club SV Horn. He signed a one-and-a-half year contract with SV Horn but made just one substitute appearance in the league before leaving the club at the end of the 2016–17 season

Honours
Kukësi
 Albanian Cup: 2018–19
 Albanian Supercup runner-up: 2019
Tirana
 Kategoria Superiore: 2021–22
 Albanian Supercup: 2022

References

External links

1989 births
Living people
People from Freising
Sportspeople from Upper Bavaria
German people of Kosovan descent
German footballers
Association football midfielders
Regionalliga players
Hamburger SV II players
SV Horn players
KF Tirana players
FK Kukësi players
KF Bylis Ballsh players
Liga I players
FC Hermannstadt players
Kategoria Superiore players
Kosovan expatriate footballers
Kosovan expatriate sportspeople in Austria
Expatriate footballers in Austria
Footballers from Bavaria